Tim Lewis (born December 18, 1961) is an American football coach and former player who is the defensive coordinator for the Arlington Renegades of the XFL. He played college football for the University of Pittsburgh and was drafted by the Green Bay Packers of the National Football League (NFL) in the first round of the 1983 NFL Draft. Following a neck injury that cut his playing career short after four seasons, Lewis began serving as a coach in the collegiate and professional levels and obtained his first head coaching position with the Birmingham Iron of the Alliance of American Football (AAF) in 2019. He also served as the defensive backs coach for the St. Louis BattleHawks of the XFL until the league folded in 2020.

Lewis is the younger brother of former Memphis Express General Manager Will Lewis. Louis Riddick, former NFL safety and current ESPN broadcaster, is his cousin. Robb Riddick, another of his cousins, was a running back for the Buffalo Bills for eight seasons.

College career

Lewis joined the Pittsburgh Panthers in 1979, playing his freshman season on a team that included eight other future NFL players:  Dan Marino, Mark May, Dwight Collins, Rickey Jackson, Russ Grimm, Jimbo Covert, Bill Maas and Hugh Green, three of whom would eventually be inducted into the Pro Football Hall of Fame.  In his three seasons at Pitt, Collins intercepted four passes and returned 26 kickoffs for 679 yards.

Playing career
Lewis was a first round pick (eleventh player chosen overall) out of the University of Pittsburgh by the Green Bay Packers in the 1983 NFL Draft. A standout cornerback, he was considered to be one of the more skilled players on what was a relatively weak Packers team. He led or shared the team in interceptions in 1983 and 1985, finishing with a career total of 16. Lewis' 99-yard interception return for a touchdown against the Los Angeles Rams on November 18, 1984, remains the Packer team record. His career was cut short by a severe neck injury suffered in a Monday Night game against the Chicago Bears in the third week of the 1986 season.

Coaching career
Beginning his coaching career in 1987 at Texas A&M, Lewis served under his former college coach at Pittsburgh, Jackie Sherrill. He would later spend time at defensive coordinator for the Pittsburgh Steelers and the New York Giants. The 2013 season marked his third year as the secondary coach for the Atlanta Falcons. In 2015, Lewis became the defensive backs coach of the San Francisco 49ers, but was let go once the season ended as part of a complete coaching overhaul. He was named the head coach of the Birmingham Iron of the Alliance of American Football on June 6, 2018. With two games remaining in the 10-week inaugural AAF season, Lewis and the Iron clinched a playoff berth, though due to the AAF's overall underfunding and ownership disputes, the playoffs were never played.

Lewis then signed on as defensive backs coach for the St. Louis BattleHawks of the XFL, a position he held until the league folded in 2020.

Lewis was officially hired by the Arlington Renegades on September 13, 2022

Head coaching record

Alliance of American Football

References

External links
 PFR

1961 births
Living people
American football cornerbacks
Atlanta Falcons coaches
Birmingham Iron coaches
Carolina Panthers coaches
Green Bay Packers players
New York Giants coaches
Pittsburgh Panthers football coaches
Pittsburgh Panthers football players
Pittsburgh Steelers coaches
San Francisco 49ers coaches
Seattle Seahawks coaches
SMU Mustangs football coaches
St. Louis BattleHawks coaches
Texas A&M Aggies football coaches
People from Quakertown, Pennsylvania
Players of American football from Pennsylvania
Houston Gamblers (2022) coaches